Baptist Evangelical Christian Union of Italy  is a Baptist Christian denomination, in Italy. It is affiliated with the Federation of Evangelical Churches in Italy and the Baptist World Alliance. The headquarters is in Rome.

History
The Union has its origins in the Apostolic Baptist Christian Union (Unione Cristiana Apostolica Battista), a federation established by a British (BMS World Mission) and American mission (International Mission Board) in 1884.  The Baptist Evangelical Christian Union of Italy is officially founded in 1956. In 1966, the churches of the Spezia Mission for Italy merge with the Union. According to a denomination census released in 2020, it claimed 120 churches and 4,300 members.

References

External links
Official website

Baptist denominations in Europe
Religious organisations based in Italy
Christian organizations established in 1956
Baptist denominations established in the 20th century
Evangelicalism in Italy